The Indian Air Force Museum, Palam, is the museum of the Indian Air Force, and is located at the Palam Air Force Station in Delhi, India.
The museum was the only one of its kind in India until the opening of the Naval Aviation Museum in Goa in 1998 and HAL Aerospace Museum in Bangalore in 2001. It showcases the history of the IAF. The museum is managed by AVM Vikram Singh, a second generation test pilot, historian, and author of war books.

Description

The Museum entrance features an indoor display gallery that contains historic photographs, memorabilia, uniforms and personal weapons of the Indian Air Force from its inception in 1932. The gallery leads to a hangar exhibiting small aircraft and Air Force inventory including anti-aircraft guns, vehicles and ordnance. Larger aircraft are exhibited outside the hangar. The outdoor gallery contains aircraft as well as several war trophies, radar equipment and captured enemy vehicles.

The Vintage Aircraft Flight services some rare aircraft and maintains them in an airworthy condition. These aircraft are not normally accessible by the general public. Large transport aircraft are stored on the apron of the airbase due to lack of space. These aircraft are displayed only on the annual Air Force Day, October 8. The museum has a small souvenir shop.

Aircraft on display

Hangar

 Westland Lysander P-9160
 Westland Wapiti K-813
 Percival Prentice IV-3381
 Hawker Hunter A-476 in Thunderbolts colour scheme
 Hawker Hurricane II B AB-832
 Hawker Tempest II HA-623
 Yokosuka MXY-7 Okha I-13
 Supermarine Spitfire XVIII HS-986
 Dassault Mystere IVa IA-1329
 Dassault Ouragan IC-554
 De Havilland Vampire NF10 ID-606
 HAL Gnat II E-2015
 Sukhoi Su-7 BMK B-888
 MiG-21 FL C-992, C-2216
 HAL Krishak HAOP-27
 HAL HF-24 Marut D-1205
 PZL TS-11 Iskra W-1757, W-1758
 F-86 Sabre 606 in Pakistani colour scheme

Outdoor Gallery
 BAE Canberra B(I)58 IF-907
 Consolidated B-24 Liberator J HE-924
 Fairchild C-119 Flying Boxcar IK-450
 Sikorsky S55C IZ-1590
 Mil Mi-4 BZ-900
 MiG-23MF SK434
 MiG-25R KP-355

Vintage Aircraft Flight
 De Havilland DH-82 Tiger Moth HU-512
 De Havilland Vampire FB52 IB-799
 Supermarine Spitfire VIII NH-631
 HAL Gnat II E-265
 HAL HT-2 IX-737
 North American Harvard HT-291
 Douglas C-47 IJ-302
 HAL HT-2 IX-732

Transport Aircraft Section
 Antonov An-12 BL-727
 De Havilland DHC-4 Caribou BM-774
 Douglas C-47 IJ-817
 Ilyushin Il-14 IL-860
 Tupolev Tu-124 V-644

See also
 Indira Gandhi International Airport
 List of aerospace museums
 Naval Aviation Museum (India)

References

External links

 Air Force Museum, webpage at Indian Air Force

Air force museums
Indian Air Force
Museums in Delhi
Military and war museums in India
Aerospace museums in India
Year of establishment missing